Hari Singh was a ruler princely state of Jammu and Kashmir, at the time of Indian independence.

Hari Singh may also refer to:

 Hari Singh (administrator) (1910–2003), Inspector General of Forests of India in the 1960s
 Hari Singh (athlete) (born 1961), former marathon runner from India
 Hari Singh Gour (1870–1949), lawyer, jurist, educationist, social reformer, poet, and novelist
 Hari Singh Dhillon (died 1764), Sikh warrior
 Hari Singh Nalwa (1791–1837), Sikh warrior
 Hari Singh (soldier) (1922–2003), Indian Army officer
 Hari Kishore Singh (1934–2013), Indian politician from Bihar
 Hari Krishna Singh, Indian politician from Madhya Pradesh
 Hari Naraian Singh, Indian politician from Himachal Pradesh
 Hari Narayan Singh (1864–1949), Indian wrestler